Lookin' Italian is a 1994 American crime film directed by Guy Magar and starring Jay Acovone and Matt LeBlanc.

Synopsis 
Vinny Pallazzo (Jay Acovone) is a retired gangster who has left the mafia after a disastrous incident. Now working as a clerk in a dusty bookshop of Los Angeles, he has to look after his young, reckless nephew Anthony (Matt LeBlanc), who lives fast, spending his time between seducing girls at the bookshop, dancing in nightclubs and playing poker games with friends. Vinny tries to do everything so that Anthony doesn't cross paths with mafia and gang wars, as he is afraid that his brash and hot-blooded nephew might end up like his father - dead. But that may be a lot more difficult than it sounds, especially after Anthony's girlfriend is brutally killed with another friend of his, by a gang. Anthony wants then to be avenged, especially after learning the truth about his father.

Cast 
 Jay Acovone : Vincenzo "Vinny" Pallazzo
 Matt LeBlanc : Anthony Manetti
 Stephanie Richards : Danielle
 Lou Rawls : Willy
 John LaMotta : Don Dinardo
 Ralph Manza : Manza
 Real Andrews : Riva
 Angelina Brunetti : the grandmother

Production 
A low-budget independent movie, Lookin' Italian is meant to be, in director  Guy Magar words, "an hommage to Scorsese and to Italian-American culture ... To me, the words "Lookin' Italian" mean "lookin' good".

Magar also mentioned in his autobiography about the good friendship between Acovone and LeBlanc as the first took the latter under his wing and helped him with his acting.

Critical reception 

The critical response was mixed. Variety said:

On the other hand, other newspapers gave some good reviews, especially for a low-budget and low-promoted film. The Press Enterprise remarked, for example, that Lookin' Italian was "A powerful, smart and sassy independently-made film that comes together so well – blending comedy and drama, issues and entertainment – is a tribute to Guy Magar who made it for the low Hollywood cost of under $1-million!"

Notes

References 
 Kiss Me Quick Before I Shoot by Guy Magar
The critic from Variety Magazine (01/13/1994) 
Article containing some reviews of this movie as well as others by Guy Magar

External links 

1994 films
Films about the American Mafia
Films shot in New York City
1990s English-language films
American gangster films
Films directed by Guy Magar
Films scored by Jeff Beal
1990s American films